Platopsomyia is a genus of flies in the family Stratiomyidae.

Species
Platopsomyia flavida James, 1937

Distribution
Cuba.

References

Stratiomyidae
Brachycera genera
Diptera of North America
Endemic fauna of Cuba